(born in Hino, Shiga on July 20, 1987) is a Japanese freestyle skier active since 2004. She competed in the 2006 Winter Olympics and competed for Japan at the 2010 Winter Olympics in Ladies' Moguls.

References 

1987 births
Living people
Japanese female freestyle skiers
Olympic freestyle skiers of Japan
Freestyle skiers at the 2006 Winter Olympics
Freestyle skiers at the 2010 Winter Olympics
Freestyle skiers at the 2014 Winter Olympics
People from Shiga Prefecture
Asian Games medalists in freestyle skiing
Freestyle skiers at the 2011 Asian Winter Games
Freestyle skiers at the 2017 Asian Winter Games
Asian Games silver medalists for Japan
Asian Games bronze medalists for Japan
Medalists at the 2011 Asian Winter Games
Medalists at the 2017 Asian Winter Games
21st-century Japanese women